is a Japanese light novel series, written by Sekina Aoi and illustrated by Saboten. Fujimi Shobo published twelve volumes from March 2015 to October 2019, under their Fujimi Fantasia Bunko imprint. An anime television series adaptation produced by Pine Jam aired from July to September 2017.

Plot 
Keita Amano, a high school student and gamer, meets the beautiful school idol Karen Tendō, and joins the school's Gaming Club. After finding it is centered around competitive gaming, he declines her offer. This rejection sets off a chain of events in the lives of Keita and his friends in matters of both video games and romance with several misunderstandings along the way.

Characters
In the light novels, each characters take turns narrating the chapters.

Main characters

A plain second-year high school student often playing video games. Although he does not have friends, he uses handheld console or mobile. He considers Karen Tendo to be the perfect girl, but declines her invitation to join the Game Club, because he prefers to play games for fun and not as something competitive. As a result, he is rather untalented at nearly every video game he plays, but still manages to have great insight into them. Keita often thinks of himself as unworthy to Karen (oblivious to their relationship) and initially would prefer to merely be her friend, but is encouraged by Tasuku to accompany Karen by asking her out. In later episodes, he reveals that sometimes, he does like to compete to win. He uses two online usernames, Tsucchi and Yama, both of which are based on his mother's maiden name Tsuchiyama. He is a big fan of independent game designer "Nobe", and teams up with online player Mono. He is very stubborn when it comes to his opinions on games, clashing with Chiaki Hoshinomori regularly over the use of moe characters and other things, even though the two are very much alike. In the light novel, Keita notes he has a younger brother.

The most beautiful girl at school and the president of the school's Game Club. She has long naturally blond hair and green eyes. She excels in everything at school from looks and popularity to sports to academics. She had enrolled in the school because of the club's prestige, but its senior members had left, so she took it upon herself to revive the club, and she privately recruits members as she does not want it to be filled with guys who are only interested in asking her out. At the beginning of the series, she invites Keita to join her club, and becomes upset when he declines her offer, having not faced rejection before in her life. This results in her stalking Keita to try and convince him to change his mind, but she develops a crush on him because he stands up to Tasuku in defending her and the club. Following her newfound infatuation, Karen's entire daily routine crumbles apart as she in unable to stop thinking about him. For a time, she mistakenly believes Keita and Chiaki are a couple. In the anime series, she spontaneously urges Keita to be a couple, but became friends instead. Karen is extremely competitive, often turning the most mundane of activities into some kind of competition. However, she learns to loosen up and live more casually through Keita.

A shy and quiet girl in Karen's class. She has long seaweed hair and purple eyes. She enjoys playing handheld and phone games like Keita, leading Tasuku to try and set them up so he can eventually pair Keita with Karen. At first, she and Keita get along incredibly well because they agree on many things about games, only to declare themselves bitter enemies over their opinions on putting moe characters in video games. She takes Tasuku's advice on improving her appearance, and cuts her hair, inadvertently making her seen as attractive by the student body, but her increased interactions with Tasuku make Aguri jealous. She is Keita's online friend "Mono" and his favorite indie game developer "Nobe", although both Chiaki and Keita are unaware of each other's online personas. She is shocked when Keita reveals his gaming personalities to the group, and begins to develop feelings for him.

Keita's classmate and a good-looking and outgoing guy. He is an occasional gamer and is skilled at arcade games. A former gamer nerd in middle school, he changed his appearance and attitude when he entered high school to avoid being stigmatized, yet feels drawn to be involved in Keita's life and his situation with Karen that he is willing to help Keita progress in his social life, seeing himself in Keita. He is quite proud that he landed a cute girlfriend Aguri, but later learns that Aguri had liked him back when he was a nerd. He is the first to make the connection between Keita and Chiaki's gaming personas, and then tries to pair the two together as friends, while Keita makes a relationship with Karen. However, he creates a Gamers Meet-Up Club with all parties involved, his efforts and increasing interactions with Chiaki and Karen, lead to misunderstandings.

Tasuku's girlfriend. In the anime, she is a petite girl with pink hair and purple eyes. Unlike any of the other characters, she does not play video games outside of claw crane games, which she frequently has Tasuku take part in so her can get her prizes, as he is far more skilled than she is. She fell in love with Tasuku, after getting a plushie doll from him at middle school, and she changed her appearance in order to get near him. She becomes upset at Tasuku for accompanying Chiaki, but allies with Keita to help him relate better with Karen. The two end up becoming each other's confidante over their relationship troubles, only for their interactions to have misunderstandings.

Supporting characters

Karen's classmate with a short black hair. He joins the Game Club at the start of the series. His specialty is in arcade puzzle games, but he adapts to learning new games and growing skills based on observing how others play. He says that he got into gaming, because he had lost his memory when he was young and playing block puzzles gives him a link to his past. The last episode in the anime series shows his secretive past in which he had escaped some underground organizations, and encounters his estranged sister Riki in the finals of a game tournament.

A third-year student and a member of the Game Club. He gets serious when it comes to FPS games. He took up gaming because his father was a mercenary who trained him in the family business when he was a child.

A third-year member of the Game Club who specializes in fighting games. Karen considers her the sexy big sister type. She has long brown hair and eyes. She does not talk to people, while playing. Karen said she got into gaming in order to win her friend back by trying to defeat her in a fighting game.

Chiaki's younger sister. She is envious of Karen's popularity and is somewhat happy that she cannot compete with her by going to a different school, where she could become a student council president. She secretly enjoys adult games and revels in being in the company of girls. When Keita visits Chiaki, and accidentally sees the "Mono" and "Nobe" information, Chiaki tells Keita that Konoha is the person behind the accounts. She tries to help her sister make friends with Keita.

Media

Light novel
Sekina Aoi first published the series in 2015 through Fujimi Shobo's Fujimi Fantasia Bunko with illustrations by Saboten. Twelve volumes were released from March 20, 2015 to October 19, 2019.

Manga
A manga adaptation with art by Tsubasa Takahashi was serialized in Fujimi Shobo's Shōnen Ace from October 2016 to September 2019. The seventh and final volume was released on October 26, 2019.

Anime
An anime television series adaptation directed by Manabu Okamoto and produced by Pine Jam was announced. It aired in Japan from July 13 to September 28, 2017. The opening theme is "GAMERS!" by Hisako Kanemoto, Manaka Iwami and Rumi Ōkubo. Crunchyroll streamed the series, while Funimation had licensed it in North America and streamed an English dub. Following Sony's acquisition of Crunchyroll, the dub was moved to Crunchyroll.

Reception
The light novel ranked seventh in 2017 in Takarajimasha's annual light novel guide book Kono Light Novel ga Sugoi!, in the bunkobon category. It ranked eighth in 2018. The anime ranked fourth in popularity on Crunchyroll in summer 2017, an unheard of ranking for a show that was a short-running Shonen Action series.

See also
Student Council's Discretion -  Another light novel series with the same creator

Works cited
  "LN" is shortened form for light novel and refers to a volume in the Gamers! light novels.
  "Ch." is shortened form for chapter and refers to a chapter number of the collected Gamers! manga
  "Ep." is shortened form for episode and refers to an episode number of the Gamers! anime

Notes

References

External links
  at Fujimi Shobo 
  
 

2017 anime television series debuts
2015 Japanese novels
Anime and manga based on light novels
AT-X (TV network) original programming
Crunchyroll anime
Fujimi Fantasia Bunko
Fujimi Shobo manga
Kadokawa Dwango franchises
Light novels
NBCUniversal Entertainment Japan
Pine Jam
Shōnen manga
Yonkoma
Tokyo MX original programming
Romantic comedy anime and manga